Amorbia cacoa is a species of moth of the family Tortricidae. It is found in Costa Rica, Guatemala and Napo Province, Ecuador. It is found at altitudes between 1,000 and 1,400 meters.

The length of the forewings is 10.4–12 mm for males and 12.8–16 mm for females. The ground colour of the forewings is hazel brown with the subbasal and median fasciae and termen chestnut. The hindwings are dark brown, the apex with hazel brown and chestnut scales. Adults are on wing most of the year.

The larvae feed on Erechtites hieracifolia, Inga species (including Inga longispica), Xylosma chlorantha, Alfaroa guanacastensis, Beilschmiedia species, Ocotea species (including Ocotea veraguensis), Licaria species, Cinnamomum brenesii, Rosa sinensis, Meliosma glabrata and Chrysochlamys glauca. Full-grown larvae reach a length of 25 mm. They are green with white lateral bands and a yellowish to reddish head.

Etymology
The species name refers to the collecting locality of most of the material examined, the Volcán Cacao in Costa Rica.

References

Moths described in 2007
Sparganothini
Moths of Central America
Moths of South America